Vivere o niente is the sixteenth studio album by Italian singer-songwriter Vasco Rossi, released by EMI Records on 29 March 2011.
The album was preceded by the single "Eh… già", on 7 February 2011. It was the best-selling album of 2011 in Italy.

Track listing

Charts

Certifications

References

2011 albums
Italian-language albums
Vasco Rossi albums
EMI Records albums